Melvyn Stewart is a former Hong Kong international lawn bowler.

Bowls career
Stewart has represented Hong Kong at two Commonwealth Games; in the fours event at the 1990 Commonwealth Games and in the fours event at the 1994 Commonwealth Games.

He won five medals at the Asia Pacific Bowls Championships, including a gold medal with David Tso and George Souza Jr. in the 1991 triples at Kowloon.

References

Hong Kong male bowls players
Living people
Bowls players at the 1990 Commonwealth Games
Bowls players at the 1994 Commonwealth Games
Year of birth missing (living people)